Károly Hieronymi (1 October 1836 – 4 May 1911) was a Hungarian engineer and politician, who served as Interior Minister between 1892 and 1895. He was a supporter of former Prime Minister Kálmán Tisza. As Minister of Trade he modernized the train services, for the Hungarian State Railways he nationalized the Budapest-Pécs, the Duna-Dráva and the Zagreb-Karlovac railway lines. He insured the independence of the railway goods turnover aiming at the seaports and its tranquillity.

Memories
In Budapest there is a street named after him. His grave is in the Kerepesi Cemetery.

References
T. Boros László, Magyar politikai lexikon 1914–1929, Budapest, Európa ny., 1929.
Budapest enciklopédia, Budapest, Corvina, 1982³.
Hieronymi Károly, in: Magyar nagylexikon, IX. köt., Budapest, Magyar Nagylexikon, 1999, 467.

1836 births
1911 deaths
People from Buda
Hungarian Interior Ministers
Hungarian engineers